Moheshkhali is an upazila of Cox's Bazar District in the Division of Chittagong, Bangladesh.

Geography
It has 33287 households and total area 362.18 km2.

Demographics
As of the 1991 Bangladesh census, Moheshkhali has a population of 219520. Males constitute are 53.13% of the population, and females 46.87%. This Upazila's eighteen up population is 90892. Maheshkhali has an average literacy rate of, and the national average of literate.

Administration
Moheshkhali Upazila is divided into Moheshkhali Municipality and eight union parishads: Bora Moheshkhali, Chota Moheshkhali, Dhalghata, Hoanak, Kalarmarchhara, Kutubjom, Matarbari, and Shaplapur. The union parishads are subdivided into 25 mauzas and 151 villages.

Moheshkhali Municipality is subdivided into 9 wards and 28 mahallas.

Notable residents
 Badiul Alam, Vice Chancellor of University of Chittagong (2006–2009), was born in Nalbila village in 1949.
 Subedar(retired) ASad Ali, Freedom fighter
 ATM Nurul Bashar Chowdhury, MP
 Alamgir Mohammad Mahfuzullah Farid, MP 
 Md. Ishak, MP
 Jahirul Islam, MP
 Maksudul Kabir, Motivational speaker, Youth mentor,  Development worker, UN employee
 Salimullah Khan, academic, essayist, and critic, grew up in Moheshkhali.
 Asheq Ullah Rafiq, MP
 [Sadh Fakir (M Ansarul Karim)], Spiritual Speaker, Psychological Reformist, Analyst & Development Worker
 Master Humayun Kabir, Head Teacher, Bara Maheshkhali Girls High School, Social activist

See also
 Upazilas of Bangladesh
 Districts of Bangladesh
 Divisions of Bangladesh

References

Upazilas of Cox's Bazar District